Hama Juvhel Fred Tsoumou (born 27 December 1990) is a Congolese professional footballer who plays as a forward for V.League 1 side Hanoi Police. His previous clubs include Ermis Aradippou, Wacker Burghausen, TSV Hartberg, FSV Zwickau, Eintracht Frankfurt, Preston North End, Alemannia Aachen and Plymouth Argyle.

Born in the Republic of the Congo, Tsoumou has represented Germany at youth international level and switched back to Congo for senior level.

Club career

Early years
Tsoumou was raised in the Congolese capital Brazzaville where he showed his talent on sand pitches. As a 10-year-old, Tsoumou came with his mother, who was studying economics, to Zwickau, where he began to play in the youth system of FSV Zwickau.

In 2003, Charly Körbel led him to the Eintracht Frankfurt football academy. Here he played until July 2006 before moving to the academy of Blackburn Rovers.

Eintracht Frankfurt
After a season in England he returned to Eintracht because he saw a better future for himself at Frankfurt. On 4 September 2007, due to call-ups for the national youth team, Eintracht manager Friedhelm Funkel gave Tsoumou the chance to train with the first squad. For the Bundesliga match on 10 November 2007 against Borussia Dortmund the striker was in the squad for the first time. Youth Coordinator, Holger Mueller gave an interview on him and compared Tsoumou to Jermaine Jones due to his athleticism and ball-winning ability.

Tsoumou debuted in the Bundesliga on 28 September 2008 against Arminia Bielefeld, when he was substituted in the 74th minute for Nikos Liberopoulos. Since making his debut, Tsoumou moved to the reserves where he was able to get more playing time and scored 5 in 29 appearances or spent time on the bench when he joined the first-team squad. On 20 March 2010, Tsuomou scored his first goal for Frankfurt in the 87th minute to equalise against Bayern Munich but Martin Fenin scored a winning goal in a 2–1 win.

Alemannia Aachen
He signed a contract with Alemannia Aachen on 4 August 2010. On 20 August 2010, Tsoumou made his debut for the club in a 2–2 draw against Union Berlin. However, Tsoumou, once again, was not able  as he spent time on the bench when he joined the first-team squad or moved to the reserves.

In 2011, he had a trial spell at Sheffield Wednesday.

Preston North End
After a successful trial, Tsoumou signed a two-year deal with Preston North End. On 4 October 2011, he scored his first goal for Preston against Morecambe in the Johnstones Paint Trophy. Preston went on to win 7–6 on penalties after the game had finished 2–2. He scored his first goal in English football against Huddersfield Town with a tap in from Iain Hume's cross. He then scored in Preston's next two fixtures against Oldham Athletic and AFC Bournemouth respectively. However under new manager Graham Westley, Tsoumou struggled to get playing time.

He was transfer listed by the club along with six other player in May 2012 in order for Westley to strengthen the Preston squad.

On 3 July 2012, his contract was cancelled by mutual consent despite having one year left on his contract.

Plymouth Argyle (loan)
On 31 January 2012, Tsoumou joined League Two side Plymouth Argyle on loan along with Alex MacDonald, until the end of the season. His move to Plymouth delighted manager Carl Fletcher. On 4 February 2012, Tsoumou made his debut for the club in a 2–2 draw against Southend United. On 31 March 2012, he scored his first goal for the club in a 1–0 win over Bradford City which was a winning goal. On 5 May 2012, in the last game of the season, Tsoumou scored Plymouth's only goal in the match against Cheltenham Town which Plymouth lost.

TSV Hartburg
On 13 September 2012, Tsoumou signed with Austrian club TSV Hartberg.

FK Senica
On 29 August 2013, he signed a two-year contract with FK Senica, following a free transfer. However his contract was cancelled and Tsoumou was released as a free agent on 1 January 2014.

Waldhof Mannheim
Tsoumou remained unattached until 14 November 2014 when he joined SV Waldhof Mannheim. He made 17 appearances, almost all from the bench, scoring 1 goal. He was released at the end of the 2014–15 Regionalliga season.

Wacker Burghausen
Tsoumou joined SV Wacker Burghausen on 3 September 2015.

FCSB
Tsoumou joined FCSB on 12  September 2019.

Hanoi Police FC 
Tsoumou joined Hanoi Police FC in 9 January 2023, and he debuted in V.League 1 with a hat-trick against Bình Định FC in CAHN's 5-0 victory.

International career
Juvhel Tsoumou has been capped by Germany at under-18 and under-19 level. He made two appearances for the under-18s against France in March 2008. Tsoumou made his under-19 debut against England in November 2008, replacing Taner Yalçın as a second-half substitute.

He was pre-selected by Congo on 19 May 2017. Tsoumou made his debut for the Congo national football team in a 1-1 2018 FIFA World Cup qualification tie with Ghana on 1 September 2017.

Career statistics

Club

Honours
Wydad AC 
CAF Champions League : 2021-22 Champion

International

References

External links
 
 
 Juvhel Tsoumou at eintracht-archiv.de 
 
 

1990 births
Living people
Sportspeople from Brazzaville
Republic of the Congo footballers
Republic of the Congo international footballers
German footballers
Germany youth international footballers
German people of Republic of the Congo descent
Naturalized citizens of Germany
Association football forwards
Eintracht Frankfurt players
Eintracht Frankfurt II players
Alemannia Aachen players
Bundesliga players
2. Bundesliga players
Regionalliga players
English Football League players
Liga I players
China League One players
Botola players
Preston North End F.C. players
Plymouth Argyle F.C. players
FK Senica players
TSV Hartberg players
Ermis Aradippou FC players
SV Wacker Burghausen players
SV Waldhof Mannheim players
FC Hermannstadt players
FC Steaua București players
Liaoning Shenyang Urban F.C. players
FC Viitorul Constanța players
Wydad AC players
Republic of the Congo expatriate footballers
German expatriate footballers
German expatriate sportspeople in England
Expatriate footballers in England
German expatriate sportspeople in Slovakia
Expatriate footballers in Slovakia
German expatriate sportspeople in Cyprus
Expatriate footballers in Cyprus
German expatriate sportspeople in Romania
Expatriate footballers in Romania
German expatriate sportspeople in China
Expatriate footballers in China
German expatriate sportspeople in Morocco
Expatriate footballers in Morocco